Warnerville may refer to:

Warnerville, Nebraska, unincorporated community
Warnerville, New York, a hamlet in Upstate New York
Warnerville, Queens, a neighborhood in New York City
Warnerville, Stanislaus County, California
Warnerville, former name of Trinidad, California
Warnerville, Rhode Island, a summer colony on Prudence Island